The 1930 Duke Blue Devils football team was an American football team that represented Duke University as a member of the Southern Conference during the 1930 college football season. In its fifth season under head coach James DeHart, the team compiled an 8–1–2 record (4–1–1 against conference opponents), finished in fourth place, shut out seven opponents, and outscored all opponents by a total of 147 to 48. Lee Davis was the team captain. The team played its home games at Duke Stadium in Durham, North Carolina.

Schedule

References

Duke
Duke Blue Devils football seasons
Duke Blue Devils football